Alfred Barton (22 May 1874 – 2 April 1960) was a New Zealand cricketer. He played in one first-class match for Wellington in 1904/05.

See also
 List of Wellington representative cricketers

References

External links
 

1874 births
1960 deaths
New Zealand cricketers
Wellington cricketers
Cricketers from Blenheim, New Zealand